The 2016 NBA playoffs was the postseason tournament of the National Basketball Association (NBA)'s 2015–16 season. The tournament ended with the Eastern Conference champion Cleveland Cavaliers defeating the defending NBA champion and Western Conference champion Golden State Warriors 4 games to 3 after the Warriors led the series 3 games to 1. In the NBA Finals, LeBron James was named NBA Finals MVP.

The Cavaliers swept their first two series and won the first two games of the Eastern Conference Finals against the Raptors to become the fourth team in NBA history to open a post-season with 10 straight victories.  They matched the 2012 San Antonio Spurs, though the 1989 and 2001 Western Conference Los Angeles Lakers had won their first eleven games en route to sweeping the first three rounds of those playoffs.  Cleveland wound up repeating this feat the next year when they swept the conference opening round, semifinal round, and winning the first 2 conference final games; this feat would be surpassed in those same 2017 NBA playoffs, when the Golden State Warriors won 15 straight games.

Overview

Western Conference
 The Golden State Warriors entered the playoffs with the best regular-season record in NBA history. The Warriors won 73 games, breaking the previous record of 72 wins set by the Chicago Bulls in the 1995–96 season. Golden State appeared in their fourth consecutive postseason for the first time since making six straight appearances from 1947–52. However, they lost to the Cleveland Cavaliers in the NBA Finals.
The Oklahoma City Thunder returned to the postseason after a one season absence.
 The San Antonio Spurs finished just six games behind the Warriors for the best record in the NBA, entering their 19th consecutive postseason, having just one home loss in the regular season, setting a new single-season franchise record for wins. The Spurs' 40–1 home record equaled the feat set by the 1985–86 Boston Celtics. However, they lost in the Conference Semifinals to the Oklahoma City Thunder.

Eastern Conference
 The Toronto Raptors also finished with a franchise record for single-season victories, winning 56 games. They finished one game shy of the Cleveland Cavaliers for the best record in the Eastern Conference.
 The Detroit Pistons qualified for the playoffs for the first time since 2009.
The Miami Heat, Charlotte Hornets, and Indiana Pacers returned to the playoffs after a one-season absence.
 For the first time since 1999, all teams from the Eastern Conference finished with a better record against at least one team from the Western Conference. In addition, all Eastern Conference teams finished with records over .500 for the first time since 2012.

First Round
 Game 4 between the Cavaliers and the Pistons was the last playoff game played at the Palace of Auburn Hills, as well as the last major league postseason game played in Oakland County. The Pistons missed the playoffs the next year and moved to their new arena for the 2017–18 season.
 Game 7 between the Raptors and Pacers and the Heat and Hornets ensured a 17th straight postseason in which at least one Game 7 was played; 1999 was the last postseason to not feature a Game 7.
 With their Game 7 win over the Pacers, the Raptors won their first playoff series since 2001.

Conference Semifinals
 With their Conference Semifinals victory over the Atlanta Hawks, the Cleveland Cavaliers became the fifth team (since the first round was extended to a best-of-seven series in 2003) to go 8–0 through the first two rounds and the first to do it twice; they first did so in 2009. This also marked the sixth consecutive year that LeBron James played in the Eastern Conference finals. James played in the Conference finals with the Miami Heat from 2011–14, and with the Cavaliers in 2015.
 With their Game 6 victory over the San Antonio Spurs, the Oklahoma City Thunder made the Western Conference Finals for the third time in five seasons. As of 2023, this remains the most recent Thunder series victory.
 Game 7 of the Eastern Conference semifinals between the Toronto Raptors and Miami Heat marked the first time since 2001 that two teams that played a Game 7 in the previous round of the playoffs faced off against each other in another Game 7 in the next round.
 With their Game 7 win over the Miami Heat, the Toronto Raptors advanced to the Eastern Conference finals for the first time in their history. This meant they also became the first Canadian-based and non-U.S. team to do so.

Conference Finals
 For the first time since 2010, no Texas team was represented in the Western Conference finals.
 Game 3 of the Eastern Conference finals between the Toronto Raptors and the Cleveland Cavaliers was Toronto's first ever Eastern Conference finals win.
 Game 4 of the Western Conference finals marked the first time that the Golden State Warriors had lost consecutive games during the season.
 With their Eastern Conference Finals victory over the Toronto Raptors, the Cleveland Cavaliers became the first team in NBA history to go 8–0 in the first two rounds, and qualify to play in the NBA Finals. This also marked the sixth consecutive NBA Finals appearance for LeBron James. He became the first player since the 1960s to accomplish this feat.
 The Western Conference finals went to a Game 7 for the first time since 2002, when the Los Angeles Lakers defeated the Sacramento Kings in overtime.
 With their 96–88 victory over the Oklahoma City Thunder in Game 7 of the Western Conference finals, the Golden State Warriors became the tenth team in NBA History to come back from a 3-1 series deficit in the playoffs. As a result, this marked the second consecutive season an NBA team rallied from a 3–1 series deficit to win the series. The Warriors also became the first team to accomplish this feat in the Conference finals since the 1981 Boston Celtics.

NBA Finals
 With their 104–89 and 110–77 wins over Cleveland in Game 1 and 2 of the NBA Finals, the Warriors posted the highest winning margin in the first two games in the NBA Finals with an +48 point differential.
 Thanks to the Cleveland Cavaliers’ 120-90 Game 3 victory, the Golden State Warriors lost every Game 3 of their 2016 playoff run.
 Draymond Green became the first NBA player to be suspended for an NBA Finals game since Jerry Stackhouse in 2006. He was suspended for Game 5, due to incurring excessive flagrant foul points in Game 4 (in which the Warriors won 108-97).
 LeBron James and Kyrie Irving became the first duo to record 40+ points in an NBA Finals game, in which the Cleveland Cavaliers won 112-97.
 In Game 6, Stephen Curry, the unanimous MVP of the regular season, was ejected for throwing a mouthpiece in the fourth quarter. His Golden State Warriors would go on to lose 101-115.
 The NBA Finals went to a Game 7 for the first time since 2013, when the Miami Heat defeated the San Antonio Spurs 95–88.

Game 7 of the 2016 NBA Finals
 Game 7 of the NBA Finals was extremely notable for The Block (basketball), in which LeBron James blocked a layup by Andre Iguodala to keep the score tied at 89. This block, along with Kyrie Irving’s title winning three pointer would seal the win for the Cleveland Cavaliers.
 With the win, the Cleveland Cavaliers became the first team to win Game 7 of the NBA Finals on the road since the 1978 Washington Bullets accomplished the feat against the Seattle SuperSonics. They also became the first team overall to win a Game 7 on the road since the Brooklyn Nets (which was also decided on a game-winning block).
 With the loss, the Golden State Warriors became the first team to overcome a 3–1 series deficit and blow a 3–1 series lead in the same playoffs. They also became the first team in NBA History to win 70+ regular season games and fail to win the NBA Championship.
 The Cavaliers became the 11th team to overcome a 3–1 series deficit and the first to do so in the NBA Finals. It is also the first time in playoff history two NBA teams rallied from a 3–1 deficit in the same year. They also clinched Cleveland’s first major sports title since 1964, effectively ending the Cleveland sports curse.
 The Cleveland Cavaliers became the first team since the 2006 Miami Heat to win an NBA Championship despite a midseason coaching change and despite trailing 2-0 (they became the fourth team overall to win the NBA Finals despite losing the first two games).
 The title the Cleveland Cavaliers won was clinched on Father's Day for the fourth time in NBA history (the previous occurrences were in 1996, 2003, and 2014). It also marked the first time since 2014 that when both teams made back-to-back Finals appearances, the team that lost in the Finals the year before won the title the next year.

Format

Within each conference, the eight teams with the most wins qualify for the playoffs. The seedings are based on each team's record.

Each conference's bracket is fixed; there is no reseeding. All rounds are best-of-seven series; the team that has four wins advances to the next round. As stated above, all rounds, including the NBA Finals, are in a 2–2–1–1–1 format. The rule for determining home court advantage in the NBA Finals is winning percentage, then head-to-head record, followed by record vs. opposite conference.

Seeding
On September 8, 2015, the NBA announced changes to how playoff teams were seeded. Previously, the division champions were guaranteed no worse than the fourth seed, while the team with the second-best record in the conference was guaranteed no worse than the second seed even if it wasn't a division champion. Starting with the 2016 playoffs, the eight playoff qualifiers in each conference will be seeded solely based on regular-season record. If two teams finish with identical records, the team that wins the regular-season series will get the higher seed. If the regular-season series is tied and one of the teams is a division champion, the division champion will get the higher seed. If three or more teams finish with identical records and one of the teams is a division champion, the division champion will get the higher seed.

Playoff qualifying
On February 27, 2016, the Golden State Warriors became the first team to clinch a playoff spot. This was the earliest a team had clinched a playoff spot in February since the 1987–88 Los Angeles Lakers. The Cleveland Cavaliers became the first Eastern Conference team to clinch a playoff spot on March 18, 2016.

Eastern Conference

Western Conference

Notes

Bracket
Teams in bold advanced to the next round. The numbers to the left of each team indicate the team's seeding in its conference, and the numbers to the right indicate the number of games the team won in that round. The division champions are marked by an asterisk. Teams with home court advantage are shown in Italics.

First round
All times are in Eastern Daylight Time (UTC−04:00)

Eastern Conference first round

(1) Cleveland Cavaliers vs. (8) Detroit Pistons

In Game 3, Kyrie Irving hit the tough corner 3 late in the 4th quarter, with only 0.7 seconds remaining on the shot clock. In Game 4, Irving also hit a three to give the Cavaliers a 4-point lead with less than a minute left. Reggie Jackson would then drive and dunk the ball to cut the lead to 2. As Irving attempted another clutch 3, it went short and the players scrambled for the ball until the Pistons came up with it. As they looked for a 3 to force Game 5, or a 2 to send it to overtime, they look to Reggie Jackson. He took a 3 over Irving, but that went short as well, and the Cavaliers move on to the second round. Game 4 was also the last playoff game ever played at The Palace of Auburn Hills.

This was the fourth playoff meeting between these two teams, with the Cavaliers winning two out of the first three meetings.

(2) Toronto Raptors vs. (7) Indiana Pacers
The Raptors won their first playoff series since the 2001 Eastern Conference Quarterfinals

This was the first meeting in the playoffs between the Raptors and Pacers.

(3) Miami Heat vs. (6) Charlotte Hornets

With the series tied at two games apiece, Game 5 was a close one. After Kemba Walker misses the stepback jumper over Hassan Whiteside, Courtney Lee gets the offensive rebound and hits the clutch 3 with 25.2 seconds left. The Hornets then block 2 shots to seal it. It was their first playoff road win since game 4 of the 2002 playoffs against the Orlando Magic. By then, Charlotte was on the verge of an upset, but in Game 6, Dwyane Wade wouldn't let his team down. Although he hasn't hit a three since December 2015, he hits 2 clutch shots including a three with less than a minute to go, as the series goes back to Miami for a Game 7. There, the Heat closed out the series and advance to the second round, to face the Toronto Raptors, who also moved on to the second round for the first time since 2001.

This was the third playoff meeting between these two teams, with the Heat winning the most recent meeting in 2014.

(4) Atlanta Hawks vs. (5) Boston Celtics

This was the 12th playoff meeting between these two teams, with the Celtics winning ten of the first eleven meetings.

Western Conference first round

(1) Golden State Warriors vs. (8) Houston Rockets

The Warriors, after game 1, went through games 2 and 3 without Stephen Curry. He injured his ankle and would be lost until game 4. Game 4 saw him injure his knee, as he slipped on a wet spot on the floor at the Toyota Center in Houston. Curry's Warriors teammates stepped up and blew out the Rockets by 27 points. They would close out the series by blowing the Rockets out again, by 33 points.

This was the second playoff meeting between these two teams, with the first meeting being in 2015, as Golden State defeated Houston 4–1 in the Western Conference finals.

(2) San Antonio Spurs vs. (7) Memphis Grizzlies

This was the fourth playoff meeting between these two teams, with San Antonio winning the most recent meeting in 2013.

(3) Oklahoma City Thunder vs. (6) Dallas Mavericks

This was the fifth playoff meeting between these two teams, with each team winning two of the four meetings.

(4) Los Angeles Clippers vs. (5) Portland Trail Blazers

This was the first meeting in the playoffs between the Clippers and Trail Blazers.

Conference semifinals

Eastern Conference semifinals

(1) Cleveland Cavaliers vs. (4) Atlanta Hawks

In Game 2, the Cavaliers made history by hitting 18 three-pointers in the first half and 25 overall to break the record for most three-point field goals made by a team in a game. During Game 3's final minute, Jeff Teague pushed LeBron James into a Hawks fan, James would later claim that he was still okay. In Game 4, both teams were locked in battle until in the final seconds, a jump ball was called between Dennis Schröder and LeBron James, and the Hawks desperately won the tip, but the game-winning shot by Paul Millsap bounced off the rim as the Cavs make a second straight sweep.

This was the third time the Cavaliers swept the Hawks in the playoffs and it would be the second consecutive season the Cavaliers swept them.

This was the third playoff meeting between these two teams, with the Cavaliers winning the first two meetings.

(2) Toronto Raptors vs. (3) Miami Heat

Even though the Raptors lost Game 1, Kyle Lowry hits a game-tying shot from half-court at the buzzer to force overtime. The play is similar to Chauncey Billups' half-court buzzer beater against the Nets in the 2004 playoffs, that also forced overtime. The end of Game 7 marks the Raptors' first ever trip to the Eastern Conference finals in their history.

Game 7 is noteworthy as being Dwyane Wade's last game with the Miami Heat (during his first stint with the team) as he would sign with the Chicago Bulls in the off-season. He would return to the Miami Heat in 2018 after being traded for a second-round pick by the Cleveland Cavaliers.

This was the first meeting in the playoffs between the Raptors and Heat.

Western Conference semifinals

(1) Golden State Warriors vs. (5) Portland Trail Blazers

In Game 4, when Stephen Curry came back from his knee injury, he scored 40 points, along with an NBA record 17 points in overtime to lead the Warriors to a 132–125 win. They closed out the series in Game 5, to advance and face the Oklahoma City Thunder, who defeated the 67-win San Antonio Spurs in their second round matchup.

This was the first meeting in the playoffs between the Warriors and Trail Blazers.

(2) San Antonio Spurs vs. (3) Oklahoma City Thunder

Game 6 is Tim Duncan's final NBA game.

This was the sixth playoff meeting between these two teams, with the Spurs winning four of the first five meetings.

Conference finals

Eastern Conference finals

(1) Cleveland Cavaliers vs. (2) Toronto Raptors

Games 1 and 2 were easy victories for the Cavaliers, as they pushed their playoff winning streak to 10 consecutive games. However, in Game 3, the Raptors dominated the first half, building up an 18-point lead, the largest deficit the Cavaliers faced all playoffs long. J.R. Smith's hot three-point shooting tried to lead Cleveland back, cutting the lead to 5, but the Raptors inevitably held on to win the game. DeMar DeRozan scored 32 points and Bismack Biyombo grabbed a Raptors' franchise record 26 rebounds. This loss by Cleveland ended their playoff winning streak at 10 games. Things would get worse in Game 4 as the Cavs were unable to slow down Kyle Lowry who scored 20 first-half points. Cleveland once again attempted a second half comeback, only this time they turned the game into a back and forth battle. Lowry's drive and score at the basket sealed the win for Toronto, tying the series at 2 games apiece. It was time for recovery for James and the Cavaliers in Game 5. They delivered yet another blowout victory, as they took a 3–2 series lead. The Raptors needed a win back home to force a decisive Game 7, but the Cavaliers closed out the series in Game 6 and won their second straight Eastern Conference title. For the sixth consecutive season, LeBron James advances to the NBA Finals, along with his teammate, James Jones.

This was the first ever meeting in any professional sports league's postseason between teams from Cleveland and Toronto. Teams from the two cities met again less than five months later (and again in the penultimate round of the playoffs) when the Cleveland Indians beat the Toronto Blue Jays in the 2016 American League Championship Series.

Western Conference finals

(1) Golden State Warriors vs. (3) Oklahoma City Thunder

During the Thunder-Warriors series, Draymond Green became the subject of multiple controversial plays against Oklahoma City 
players, most notably Steven Adams.
 
In Game 1, the Thunder upset the Warriors 108–102 and took a 1–0 series lead. It marked the Warriors' first loss at Oracle Arena in Oakland in the playoffs, as well as their third home loss of the 
season. In Game 2, despite a close game at the half, the Warriors soundly defeated the Thunder 118–91. Television cameras appeared to show Draymond Green kicking Steven Adams in the groin while he was 
attempting a layup. In Game 3, in the comfort of a raucous Chesapeake Energy Arena, the Thunder dominated the Warriors 133–105. During the game, Green 
received a flagrant foul 1 for again appearing to kick Adams in the groin. In Game 4, the Thunder once again handed the Warriors a commanding 118–94 defeat to take a 3–1 series lead. Green appeared to trip Enes Kanter during the game.
 Returning to Oracle Arena in Game 5, the Warriors held on to defeat the Thunder 120-111, cutting their series deficit to 3-2. Kevin Durant scored 40 points in the loss. Despite their Game 5 loss, the Thunder were favored to advance to the NBA Finals in the comfort of their home court in Game 6, but the Warriors stunned the Thunder thanks to Klay Thompson, who scored a series-high 41 points and made an NBA playoff record 11 3s. Klay's performance and a poor shooting night from Kevin Durant, as the Warriors won the game 108–101 and tied the series 3-3, forcing a Game 7 in the Bay Area. In Game 7, Oklahoma City built a 13-point lead 
during the game and led 48–42 at halftime. However, the Thunder lost focus in the third quarter. After the Warriors thwarted Oklahoma City's brief comeback attempt in the fourth quarter, Golden State won 96–88 and became the 10th team to win an NBA playoff series after being down 3 games to 1. Game 7 was the last game Kevin Durant played with the Oklahoma City Thunder, before joining his opponent in this series, the Golden State Warriors.

This was the third meeting in the playoffs between the Warriors and Thunder, with both teams tied at one a piece.

NBA Finals: (E1) Cleveland Cavaliers vs. (W1) Golden State Warriors

After winning three of the first four games in the Finals with relative ease, the Warriors appeared to be overwhelming the Cavaliers as they moved to being within one win from back-to-back championships. However, the series shifted dramatically after Golden State's All-Star forward, Draymond Green, was suspended for game 5 after an altercation with Cleveland's LeBron James in game 4. Absent Green, the Warriors were lacking defensively, as Kyrie Irving and LeBron James became the first teammates to score 40 or more points each in a Finals game and led the Cavaliers to a 112–97 win to force game 6. Back in the Quicken Loans Arena for their final home game of the season, the Cavaliers tied the series at 3 games apiece by defeating Golden State, 115–101. After receiving his sixth personal foul in the fourth quarter, Stephen Curry was ejected for the first time in his career after throwing his mouthpiece at a Cavaliers fan. Game 7 came down to the wire. Late in the fourth quarter, with the score tied at 89, Andre Iguodala received a bounce pass from Curry. As Iguodala went up for the layup, he was blocked from behind by James, in what has since been recognized as one of the most memorable blocks in NBA playoff history, and among the most iconic plays of James's career. With less than a minute to play, Kyrie Irving converted a 3-point shot to give the Cavaliers the lead. On their next possession, James was fouled by Green while attempting a dunk, and made one of his two free throws to increase the lead to four. While the Warriors managed to get the ball into the hands of Curry for a chance to cut the deficit to one, he was guarded well by Cavaliers guard Iman Shumpert, and Curry was forced to take a sub par shot that missed, sealing the game as the city of Cleveland, Ohio's 52-year sports curse finally ended. The Cavaliers became the eleventh team to win an NBA playoff series after trailing 3 games to 1, and the first to do so in the NBA Finals. The Warriors became the best team (by regular season record) to fail to capture an NBA championship. Cleveland also became only the fourth team to win Game 7 of the NBA Finals on the road. This was the first NBA championship for the Cavaliers.

This was the second meeting in the NBA Finals between the Warriors and Cavaliers, with the Warriors winning the first meeting last season.

Statistical leaders

Media coverage

Television
ESPN, TNT, ABC, ESPN2, ESPNews and NBA TV broadcast the NBA playoffs nationally in the United States. In the first round, regional sports networks affiliated with the teams can also broadcast the games, except for games televised on ABC. Throughout the first two rounds, TNT televised games Saturday through Thursday, ESPN televised games Friday and Saturday, and ABC televised select games on Saturday and Sunday, usually in the afternoon. NBA TV , ESPN2 and ESPNEWS aired select weekday games in the first round. TNT televised the Western Conference finals and ESPN televised the Eastern Conference finals. ABC televised the NBA Finals for the 14th consecutive year.

In Canada, national coverage is divided between the TSN and Sportsnet families of channels, with each group carrying approximately half of all games featuring the Toronto Raptors (produced independently of the U.S. national broadcasts regardless of round), and half of all other games (simulcast from the applicable U.S. broadcaster).

Radio

ESPN Radio had exclusive national radio rights to broadcast the playoffs in the United States. They broadcast mostly ABC games during the first two rounds, all of the conference finals, and the NBA Finals.

In Canada, the playoffs were carried on TSN Radio.

References

External links

Basketball – Reference.com's 2016 Playoffs section

Playoffs
National Basketball Association playoffs
ABS-CBN television specials